is a passenger railway station located in the city of  Nagareyama, Chiba Prefecture, Japan operated by the private railway operator Ryūtetsu. It is numbered station RN6.

Lines
Nagareyama Station is the terminus of the Nagareyama Line, and is located 5.7 km from the opposing terminus of the line at Mabashi Station.

Station layout
The station consists of one island platform.

History
Nagareyama Station was opened on March 14, 1916.

Passenger statistics
In fiscal 2018, the station was used by an average of 2713 passengers daily.

Surrounding area
 Nagareyama City Hall
 site of Kondo Isami jin'ya

See also
 List of railway stations in Japan

References

External links

 official home page  

Railway stations in Japan opened in 1916
Railway stations in Chiba Prefecture
Nagareyama